The 2000 Tottori earthquake occurred on 6 October 2000, at  with a moment magnitude of 6.7 and a maximum Mercalli intensity of VIII (Severe). The epicenter was near Yonago and Matsue. About $150 million in damage was caused (with 104 buildings destroyed) and between 130-182 people were injured.

See also
List of earthquakes in 2000
List of earthquakes in Japan

References

Further reading

External links

Tottori earthquake
Tottori earthquake
October 2000 events in Japan
Earthquakes of the Heisei period
Buried rupture earthquakes
2000 disasters in Japan